James Wilson Seaton (May 28, 1824February 11, 1904) was an American lawyer, Democratic politician, and Wisconsin pioneer.  He served in the Wisconsin State Senate and Assembly, representing Grant County.

Biography

Born in New Hartford, New York, Seaton studied at Cazenovia Seminary in Cazenovia, New York. He then studied law in Rome, New York. In 1847, he moved to Potosi, in the Wisconsin Territory, where he was admitted to the Wisconsin bar and practiced law. He was also in the mercantile and insurance business.

He was editor of the Potosi Republican until 1855, when he was succeeded by Edwin R. Paul, and he wrote several articles about the history of Grant County, Wisconsin.

Seaton served in the town government and on the Grant County Board of Supervisors and was chairman of the county board. He served in the Wisconsin State Senate for part of 1853, winning a special election to fill the remainder of the 1853 term after the resignation of Joel C. Squires.  He later served in the Wisconsin State Assembly in 1859 and 1860. He was a member of the Democratic Party.

Seaton died in Potosi, Wisconsin.

References

External links
 

1824 births
1904 deaths
People from New Hartford, New York
People from Potosi, Wisconsin
Cazenovia College alumni
Businesspeople from Wisconsin
Editors of Wisconsin newspapers
Writers from New York (state)
Writers from Wisconsin
Schoolteachers from Wisconsin
County supervisors in Wisconsin
Democratic Party Wisconsin state senators
19th-century American newspaper editors
19th-century American politicians
19th-century American businesspeople
19th-century American educators
Democratic Party members of the Wisconsin State Assembly